Jinyi Qi (祁锦毅) is a professor at the Department of Biomedical Engineering in the University of California, Davis. He was named Fellow of the Institute of Electrical and Electronics Engineers (IEEE) in 2014 for contributions to statistical image reconstruction for emission-computed tomography. He graduated from Tsinghua University.

References

Year of birth missing (living people)
Living people
University of California, Davis faculty
Fellow Members of the IEEE
Tsinghua University alumni